Maio is the easternmost of the Sotavento islands of Cape Verde. Maio is located south of the island of Boa Vista and east of Santiago. Administratively, the island forms one concelho (municipality): Maio.

History
The island was discovered in 1460. It was first settled at the end of the 16th century, when the land was used to raise livestock, especially goats. Salt was first exploited in the 17th century which caused the population to grow. The English exported salt to Europe from Porto Inglês, hence the name of that city.

The inconclusive Battle of Maio was fought between British and French frigate squadrons off the island's southern coast on 23 January 1814 in the last stages of the Napoleonic Wars. Due to persisting drought many inhabitants emigrated from Maio in the 20th century.

Geography
The island has an area of 274.5 km2. It is 24.1 km long and 16.3 km wide. The tallest mountain on the island (436 m) is near the east coast, in a mountain range named Monte Penoso. Terras Salgadas is a salty plain in the far north. The northernmost point on the island is Ponta Cais. 20% of the island area (54.5 km2) is forested and 28% of the island area (76.0 km2) is a protected area. Bays includes Baía do Galeão and Baía da Santana to the north and in the southeast is a lagoon named Lagoa Cimidor. The uninhabited islet Ilhéu Laje Branca lies near its north coast. The island's main town is Porto Inglês, near which its airport, Maio Airport lies.

Municipality

Administratively, the island of Maio is covered by one municipality, Concelho do Maio. This municipality consists of one freguesia (civil parish), Nossa Senhora da Luz, which also covers the whole island. The freguesia is subdivided into the following settlements:

Alcatraz
Barreiro (town)
Calheta (town)
Cascabulho
Figueira
Morro
Morrinho
Pedro Vaz
Pilão Cão
Porto Inglês (city)
Praia Gonçalo
Ribeira Dom João
Santo António

Politics

Since 2004, the Movement for Democracy (MpD) is the ruling party of the municipality. The results of the latest elections, in 2016:

Population

In the 1830s, the population was estimated at 2,500. Most people in Maio are Roman Catholic.

Economy
The island prospered around salt collecting in its early days of colonialism, with a little agriculture and grazing.

There are two types of agriculture practiced in Maio, rain fed and irrigated. During the raining season products as corn, beans, pumpkins and melons are being cultivated. Products that farmers cultivate year round are sweet potato, cassava, papaya, fig, coconut and tamarind. Goats, cows, pigs, chickens and donkeys are common on the island. Few people own a horse. Scarcity of water is the biggest problem for the locals.

Fishery is important and abundant available. Tuna, sailfish and different coral fishes such as the coral hind are caught.

The economy is heavily supported by migrants who send money to their family on the island.

Sports

Football is by far the most popular sport, but basketball and futsal along with water sports as surfing, diving and swimming are becoming more popular.

Notable people
Maria Helena da Costa Dias, Cape Verdean born Portuguese writer and translator
Edy Tavares, basketball player
Horace Silver, jazz pianist, composer, and arranger

References

External links

 Official website 
 caboverde.com
 maiocapeverde.com

 
Municipalities of Cape Verde
Islands of Cape Verde